Richard John Poole (born 3 July 1957) is an English retired footballer who played as a centre forward in the Football League for Brentford and Watford and in France for Sporting Toulon Var.

Playing career

Brentford 
Along with Kevin Harding, Poole was one of the first players recruited when the Brentford youth team was relaunched in 1972, after joining the club at the age of 12. Poole made his professional debut in a Fourth Division match versus Lincoln City in February 1974, while still an apprentice. At 16 years, 7 months and 20 days old, Poole's league debut was at the time the club's second-youngest. In the final home game of the 1973–74 season, Poole scored one and made another in a 2–0 win against Bradford City on 20 April, a result which saved the Bees from having to apply for re-election. Poole still stands as Brentford's youngest league goalscorer. He signed a professional contract during the 1975 off-season and made seven further appearances for the club, before leaving in July 1976.

Watford 
Poole joined fellow Fourth Division club Watford in July 1976 and made 9 appearances and scored one goal during the 1976–77 season.

Sporting Toulon Var 
In 1977, Poole emigrated to France and joined Division 2 Group A club Sporting Toulon Var. He made 8 appearances and scored two goals during the 1977–78 season, before a knee ligament injury brought his career to an end in April 1978. He was a teammate of future France and Ivory Coast internationals Jean Tigana and Jean-Désiré Sikely respectively.

Career statistics

References

1957 births
Living people
People from Heston
Footballers from Hounslow
English footballers
Brentford F.C. players
English Football League players
Watford F.C. players
SC Toulon players
Ligue 2 players
Association football forwards
English expatriate footballers
English expatriate sportspeople in France
Expatriate footballers in France